Koelga is an extinct genus of prawn in the order Decapoda. It contains the species Koelga curvirostris and Koelga muensteri.

References

Penaeidae
Jurassic crustaceans
Fossils of Germany